Nick Malouf (born 19 March 1993) is an Australian professional rugby union footballer who plays as a wing for the Australia national rugby sevens team.

In his early career, he formally played for Premiership Rugby club Leicester Tigers for the 2017–18 season. He began playing the sport for the University of Queensland rugby club in the flanker position. Malouf later joined the Australian sevens team in 2012 after helping Australia's international development side the Aussie Thunderbolts to a win at the Noosa International Sevens Festival.

Malouf made his World Rugby Sevens Series debut in Dubai in 2012. In June 2017 is when he signed to play over in England for the Leicester Tigers. His form earned him a try of the week award against Gloucester in round three of the competition. Malouf later departed England to rejoin the Australian sevens program ahead of the 2018 Rugby World Cup Sevens. He represented Australia at the 2016 Olympic Games.

Malouf was a member of the Australian men's rugby seven's squad at the Tokyo 2020 Olympics. The team came third in their pool round and then lost to Fiji 19-0 in the quarterfinal. He competed for Australia at the 2022 Rugby World Cup Sevens in Cape Town.

References

External links 
 
 
 
 
 

1993 births
Australian rugby union players
Rugby union players from Brisbane
Male rugby sevens players
Australia international rugby sevens players
Living people
Rugby sevens players at the 2016 Summer Olympics
Olympic rugby sevens players of Australia
Leicester Tigers players
Rugby sevens players at the 2020 Summer Olympics
Rugby union centres
Rugby union wings
New South Wales Waratahs players
20th-century Australian people
21st-century Australian people
Rugby sevens players at the 2022 Commonwealth Games